The Tommy Flanagan Trio is an album by jazz pianist Tommy Flanagan which was recorded in 1960 and released on the Moodsville label.

Reception

The AllMusic site awarded the album 3 stars stating "Since this set (reissued on CD) was originally recorded for the Prestige subsidiary Moodsville, most of the selections are taken at slow tempoes... quietly and with taste".

Track listing 
 "In the Blue of the Evening" (Tom Adair, Alfonso D'Artega) - 3:44  
 "You Go to My Head" (J. Fred Coots, Haven Gillespie) - 4:30  
 "Velvet Moon" (Eddie DeLange, Josef Myrow) - 5:22  
 "Come Sunday" (Duke Ellington) - 3:38  
 "Born to Be Blue" (Mel Tormé, Robert Wells) - 4:24  
 "Jes' Fine" (Tommy Flanagan) - 5:34  
 "In a Sentimental Mood" (Ellington, Irving Mills) - 6:39

Personnel 
Tommy Flanagan - piano - solo track 4 
Tommy Potter - bass 
Roy Haynes - drums

References 

Tommy Flanagan albums
1960 albums
Moodsville Records albums
Albums produced by Esmond Edwards
Albums recorded at Van Gelder Studio